Ramakrishna Mission Ashrama, Narendrapur may refer to:
Ramakrishna Mission Vidyalaya, Narendrapur
Ramakrishna Mission Residential College, Narendrapur